The Fensch or Fentsch is a river in the Moselle department of the Grand Est region of France. It is a left tributary of the Moselle, and thus a sub-tributary of the Rhine.

Geography 

It rises in Fontoy in the west of the Moselle department.
It then crosses  Knutange, Nilvange, Hayange, Serémange-Erzange and Florange  before discharging from the left into the Moselle between Metz and Thionville on the border of the commune of Illange.
It generally flows from west to east.

Originally, as shown by the Cassini map, the waters of the lower part of the Fensch combined with the waters of the Veymerange and fed the moat around the town of Thionville before joining the Moselle. After the removal of the fortifications, the Fensch was diverted to its current course to supply water to the new ironworks installed a little south of this locality.

Names 
 Feuschen (1403), Fensth (1544), Flensch (1606), Fenche (1779), Feusche
 In German: Fentsch

Communes and cantons crossed

The Fensch crosses seven communes and four cantons in the department of Moselle.
From upstream to downstream these are Fontoy (source), Knutange, Nilvange, Hayange, Serémange-Erzange, Florange and Illange (mouth).
In terms of cantons, the Fensch originates in the canton of Algrange, crosses the canton of Hayange and canton of Fameck, and has its mouth in the canton of Yutz.

Tributaries 
The river has four tributaries:
The petite Fensch
The Algrange and Marspich streams
The canalized Moselle

Hydrology 

The Fensch is fed by a fairly high rainfall. 
It also receives significant amounts of mine water from mines in the region, which helps to increase the flow. 
The flow was observed for a period of 35 years (1968–2002) in Florange, a locality in the Moselle department at its confluence with the Moselle.

The Fensch has very moderate seasonal fluctuations of flow, which is rarely the case in northern Lorraine. 
Beginning in April, the flow gradually decreases to the low summer-fall waters that occur from July to October.
The fluctuations are more pronounced over short periods or between years.

At low water level, the 3 consecutive-day minimum flow can drop to  during a five-year dry period, which is far from severe.
Floods are moderately important, given the small size of its watershed. They are proportionally more or less half as large as those of its neighbor, the Orne. 
This flood was of a two-year order, and therefore not at all exceptional.

Overall, the Fensch is a very abundant river, more than most rivers of the Moselle basin, particularly those of the Moselle department. 

Industry 
The Fensch Valley is known for its iron and steel industry. 
Part of the course of the river is even covered where it crosses the town of Hayange and by facilities of the ArcelorMittal ironworks of Florange.
The foundation stone for the Sollac mill was laid on 23 December 1949 in the small village of Serémange on the banks of Fensch river.
U.S. Ambassador David K. E. Bruce said at the groundbreaking ceremony, which was attended by the French Foreign Minister Robert Schuman and Minister of Industry Robert Lacoste, that he hoped the French iron-steel industry would soon be the first in Europe".

Culture 

The region inspired Bernard Lavilliers's Fensch Vallée, the title song of his fourth album, Les Barbares (1976).

Notes

Sources

Rivers of Moselle (department)
Rivers of France
Rivers of Grand Est